The FSB Academy, in full the Academy of the Federal Security Service of the Russian Federation, is an education and research institution federally chartered to prepare Russian intelligence personnel for the Federal Security Service in particular and for the Russian Intelligence Community in general.

The academy was formed by presidential decree on August 24, 1992 on the foundation of the Higher School of the KGB, and is located in Michurinsky Prospekt, Moscow, Russia. It consists of the Institute of Cryptography, Telecommunications and Computer Science (Институт криптографии, связи и информатики, ИКСИ) and the Institute for Operational Training (Институт подготовки оперативного состава, ИПОС) in various facilities.

Colonel General Viktor Ostroukhov has been Head of the Academy from 2007 until 2019. It was then directed by Colonel General Yevgeny Sysoyev and since 2022 it has been directed by Lieutenant General Nikolay Vladimirovich Plotnikov.

History

Background
The Presidium of the VChK (The first security service of the Soviet Russia) decided to establish a special institute for operational training. The first course began in April 1921.

In 1922 the course was renamed the Higher Courses of the State Political Directorate (GPU).

In May 1930 Moscow created higher schools for basic and advanced training of secret agents; on June 4, 1930 the school was known as the Central School of OGPU. July 14, 1934, after the formation of the People's Commissariat of Internal Affairs, the former OGPU Central School was renamed the Central School of General Directorate for State Security (GUGB) of the NKVD.

On March 21, 1939 the Central School of GUGB NKVD was reorganized as the Graduate School of the NKVD. By the early 1940s, every third head of the Soviet security organs was a graduate of the course. During the Great Patriotic War, the school trained more than seven thousand security officers who organized the fight against Nazi Germany.

By Resolution of the Council of Ministers on August 2, 1962 the KGB Higher School was named after Dzerzhinsky. During the 1960s to 1980s, graduates took part in countering foreign intelligence services and conducting operational and combat activities.

FSB Academy
In 1995, the Higher School of the KGB was renamed the FSB Academy.

See also
Institute of Cryptography, Telecommunications and Computer Science
FBI Academy
Moscow Border Institute of the FSB of the Russian Federation
 Border Patrol Academy

References

Further reading
 Органы государственной безопасности СССР в Великой Отечественной войне. Сборник документов в 8 т. Том 1. Накануне. В 2-х кн. Кн. 2 (1 января — 21 июня 1941 г.). —М.: А/О «Книга и бизнес», 1995.

External links
The FSB Academy Official Website

 
Educational institutions established in 1921
Military academies of Russia
Intelligence analysis
Intelligence education
1921 establishments in Russia